A canopy seed bank or aerial seed bank is the aggregate of viable seed stored by a plant in its canopy. Canopy seed banks occur in plants that postpone seed release for some reason.

It is often associated with serotiny, the tendency of some plants to store seed in a cone (e.g. in the genus Pinus) or woody fruits (e.g. in the genus Banksia), until seed release is triggered by the passage of a wildfire.

It also occurs in plants that colonise areas of shifting sands such as sand dunes. In such cases, the seed is held in the canopy even if the canopy becomes buried; thus, the seed is anchored in place until good germination conditions occur.

References

Plant morphology